S-14,506 is a phenylpiperazine, a 5-HT1A receptor agonist, and a dopamine receptor antagonist.

External links
S 14506: novel receptor coupling at 5-HT(1A) receptors
Dopamine receptor antagonist properties of S 14506, 8-OH-DPAT, raclopride and clozapine in rodents

G protein-coupled receptors
Naphthylpiperazines
Benzamides
Fluoroarenes